Monocarboxylate transporter 9  (MCT9, solute carrier family 16, member 9, SLC16A9) is a protein that in humans is encoded by the SLC16A9 gene.

Clinical relevance 

Mutations in the SLC16A9 gene have been associated with carnitine levels in blood.

References

Further reading 

Human proteins
Solute carrier family